Buszkowo may refer to the following places:
Buszkowo, Greater Poland Voivodeship (west-central Poland)
Buszkowo, Bydgoszcz County in Kuyavian-Pomeranian Voivodeship (north-central Poland)
Buszkowo, Żnin County in Kuyavian-Pomeranian Voivodeship (north-central Poland)
Buszkowo, Pomeranian Voivodeship (north Poland)